The Galactic Empire is a fictional autocracy featured in the Star Wars franchise. It was first introduced in the 1977 film Star Wars and appears in its two sequels: The Empire Strikes Back (1980) and Return of the Jedi (1983). It is the main antagonistic faction of the original trilogy. An oppressive, autocratic regime with a complicated bureaucracy, the Galactic Empire seeks to ensure singular rule and social control over every planet and civilization within the galaxy.

At its peak, the Galactic Empire sprawls over much of the known Star Wars galaxy, which consists of millions of star systems and billions more fringe colonies, shipyards, fortress worlds, and outer territories. The Empire's origins are depicted in the prequel film Star Wars: Episode III – Revenge of the Sith (2005), where it replaces the Galactic Republic at the end of the Clone Wars orchestrated by the Republic's Supreme Chancellor, Palpatine. Palpatine is also secretly the Sith Lord Darth Sidious, who masterminded the war in order to destroy the Jedi and restore the Sith to power.

Palpatine falsely accuses the Jedi of causing the Clone Wars, a secessionist war, to weaken the Republic and gain power. The Sith Lord manipulates the Galactic Senate into using clone troopers created during the conflict to purge the Jedi. After engineering these threats himself, Palpatine reorganizes the Republic into a state that could "ensure the security and continuing stability, and [provide] a safe and secure society" – the first Galactic Empire with himself as its ruler. The Senate overwhelmingly supports this decision and lauds the newly-proclaimed Emperor's apparent resolve, bravery, and selflessness.

With Emperor Palpatine keeping mostly to the shadows, his Sith apprentice, Darth Vader maintains a more public presence and leads the Imperial forces, thus acting as a personification of the Galactic Empire's power. By the time of Episode IV – A New Hope, the faction has transformed into a fully autocratic regime, opposed by the Alliance to Restore the Republic. The completion of the Death Star, a doomsday weapon, allows Emperor Palpatine to instigate a self-coup and dissolve the Imperial Senate, granting more power to the likes of Grand Moff Tarkin. The Galactic Empire is described and portrayed in various Star Wars media as a brutal dictatorship, one based on "anthropocentrism, nationalization, state terrorism, xenophobia, power projection, threat of lethal force, and, above all else, constant fear".

The Galactic Empire is defeated in Return of the Jedi, but the First Order is formed by Imperial remnants in the sequel trilogy, set 30 years later.

Appearances in the chronological order
Star Wars: Episode III – Revenge of the Sith (2005)
Star Wars: The Clone Wars (2008–2020) (Briefly)
Star Wars: The Bad Batch (2021–present)
Solo: A Star Wars Story (2018)
Obi-Wan Kenobi (2022)
Andor (2022–present)
Star Wars Rebels (2014–2018)
Rogue One: A Star Wars Story (2016)
Star Wars: Episode IV – A New Hope (1977) (First appearance) 
Star Wars: Episode V – The Empire Strikes Back (1980)
Star Wars: Episode VI – Return of the Jedi (1983)
The Mandalorian (2019–present) (As several different rump states)
Star Wars: Episode VII – The Force Awakens (2015) (As the "First Order")
Star Wars: Episode VIII – The Last Jedi (2017) (As the "First Order")
Star Wars: Episode IX – The Rise of Skywalker (2019) (As the "First Order" and "Final Order")

Themes

Star Wars creator George Lucas sought to make the First Galactic Empire aesthetically and thematically similar to Nazi Germany and to appear to be fascist. Similar to Nazi Germany, the Galactic Empire is a dictatorship based on rigid control of society that dissolved a previous democracy and is led by an all-powerful supreme ruler. The Empire, like the Nazis, desires the creation of totalitarian order and utilizes excessive force and violence to achieve their ends. The title of the Empire's main soldiers, the stormtroopers, is somewhat similar to the name given to Adolf Hitler's  (SA, "storm department") paramilitary bodyguards.

The visual appearance of Darth Vader in his all-black uniform combined with his devout obedience to Palpatine has allusion to the black-uniformed Nazi  (SS). According to a Lucasfilm-authorized source, Darth Vader's relationship with Palpatine is akin to SS leader Heinrich Himmler's relationship with Hitler. The uniforms of Imperial military officers also bear resemblance to uniforms used in Nazi Germany as well as 19th century Polish ulans (mounted lancers)—who wore a tunic, riding breeches, and boots like the Empire's officers wear—as well as the Imperial officers' cap resembling the field caps historically worn by German and Austrian troops.

In addition to Nazi Germany, there was also at least one portion of the Galactic Empire that was based on the Soviet Union, which is the various military personnel and TIE Fighters that are flying in formation as Palpatine arrives on the Death Star in Return of the Jedi. According to Lucas, the ceremony for the Emperor's arrival was inspired by May Day military parades in the Soviet Union.

Lucas has also indicated that the Galactic Empire's struggle against a smaller guerilla force was inspired by America's involvement in the Vietnam War and his surprise at how few people spoke up against the war.

Palpatine's rise to power has been related to those of Julius Caesar, Augustus, Napoleon Bonaparte, and Adolf Hitler. Palpatine's consolidation of power and declaring himself emperor is like the Roman political figure Octavian (later renamed Augustus), in that Octavian manipulated the Roman Senate as Palpatine did with the Galactic Senate; he legitimized authoritarian rule by saying that corruption in the Senate was hampering the powers of the head of state; he pressured the Roman Senate to give him extraordinary powers as Consul of the Republic to deal with a crisis and he falsely claimed that he would rescind those powers once the crisis was over; and, as with the transition of the Roman Republic into the Roman Empire, Octavian, like Palpatine, relied on his strong control over military force.

Depiction

Origins
The Galactic Empire is born out of the collapsing Galactic Republic. However, its seeds of decadence are planted and nurtured by the Sith over a period of centuries, that bore fruit during the Clone Wars, the epic war between the Republic and the separatist Confederacy of Independent Systems (CIS) depicted in Episode II: Attack of the Clones and Episode III: Revenge of the Sith.  The CIS droid army was never intended to be victorious in a quick early decisive battles, the Sith's plan was to have a long, persistent and costly war so Sidious would slowly gain more and more "emergency power" in the Senate to a point where him becoming the emperor de jure was just a formality change in title to match his de facto absolute despotism. Because of a corrupt senate, and a civil war, Palpatine is easily able to take control over the Republic.

In Episode I: The Phantom Menace, amid a trade dispute and invasion of his home world of Naboo, Senator Palpatine convinces Queen Padmé Amidala to call for a vote of no confidence in Supreme Chancellor of the Republic Finis Valorum. Palpatine is elected Supreme Chancellor in Valorum's place.

As fighting intensifies in Episode II, the Galactic Senate, the legislature of the Republic, grants Palpatine emergency powers to deal with the crisis. Palpatine promises to return his powers once peace and order is restored. His first order is to create a massive army of clone troopers. He exploits the Clone Wars to amass political power, and, by the time of Episode III, he is effectively a dictator.

The Jedi distrust Palpatine's motives, fearing he has come under the influence of a Dark Lord of the Sith named Darth Sidious. Their concerns are shared by several senators, who suspect Palpatine may not return his emergency powers once the war ends. The film eventually reveals that Palpatine and Sidious are one and the same, and Palpatine engineered the conflicts as a false flag.

Palpatine reveals himself as a Sith Lord to Jedi Knight Anakin Skywalker, promising to save Padmé, Skywalker's secret wife, from dying while giving birth to their child. Skywalker reports Palpatine's true identity to the Jedi. However, when Jedi Master Mace Windu confronts Palpatine, Skywalker comes to Palpatine's aid and helps him kill Windu. Desperate to save Padmé, Skywalker pledges himself to the dark side of the Force and becomes Palpatine's third apprentice, Darth Vader.  Palpatine declares the Jedi to be traitors and all but exterminates the Jedi Order in a galaxy-wide slaughter, while sending Vader to kill everyone in the Jedi Temple and assassinate the Separatist leaders.

Secure in his power and position, Palpatine reorganizes the Republic into the Galactic Empire, with himself as Emperor for life. Two remaining Jedi, Obi-Wan Kenobi and Yoda, mount a counterattack. Obi-Wan defeats Vader and leaves him for dead, but Yoda's duel with Palpatine ends in a stalemate; both Jedi are forced to go into exile. Grievously wounded, Vader is rescued by Palpatine and fitted with cybernetics and a black suit of armor with a life support system. After Padmé dies giving birth to twins, Yoda and Obi-Wan decide to separate the children – Luke and Leia – in order to hide them from the Sith. Luke goes to Vader's stepfamily on Tatooine, while Leia is adopted by Senator Bail Organa of Alderaan.

The old Republican symbolisms were discarded on favor of The Imperial Crest and Emblem which itself comes from the vendu galactic Randall symbol. Originally this was a symbol of unity and non-confrontation; Palpatine would pervert this peaceful symbol by removing two spokes from the wheel; similar to how Hitler took the swastika from ancient Eastern religions like Hinduism and Buddhism.

Government

Legislature
The Senate, now known as the Imperial Senate, nominally continues to exist, though it is virtually powerless. Palpatine dissolves the Senate (off-camera) in A New Hope after discovering that several members of the Senate are founding members of the Rebel Alliance, a guerrilla army dedicated to overthrowing the Empire and restoring the Republic.

Executive
With the end of the Clone Wars, the purge of the Jedi Order and the formation of the First Galactic Empire, Palpatine rules with absolute power as Emperor. Between the events of Revenge of the Sith and A New Hope, Palpatine rules the galaxy from the confines of his heavily guarded Imperial Palace on Coruscant. Coruscant was introduced in Timothy Zahn's then-canon novel Heir to the Empire. It made its film debut in the special edition of Return of the Jedi.  Inspiration for the world-spanning city came from 1940s science fiction works, especially Isaac Asimov's Trantor.  Visually, it resembles the Art Deco skyscrapers of Manhattan.

Star Wars Battlefront II (2017) depicts Palpatine as intentionally having no clear line of succession, desiring either immortality or the destruction of the Empire.

Imperial Ruling Council
Unwilling to embroil himself in the day-to-day running of the Galactic Empire, the Emperor leaves the mundane work to the Imperial Ruling Council (IRC), an advisory body with whom he confers on vital affairs of state. The group is made up of Imperial Advisors, "yes-men" that serve as ministers and counselors who are rarely far from his side and have a noted taste in extravagant clothing. The spokesman of the Imperial Ruling Council is the Grand Vizier Mas Amedda, who attends most of the Imperial Senate's sessions. Lord Amedda functions as an intermediary for Emperor Palpatine, managing his schedule, screening his calls and contacting other Imperial dignitaries and officers on his behalf; despite this, he is deemed a mere sycophant by many. The Imperial Ruling Council also keeps tabs on the progress of the Imperial Military and delivers news from Imperial High Command to the Emperor.

Imperial High Command
The Emperor leaves the actual martial management to Imperial High Command (IHC), a central command structure that notably coordinates the Galactic Empire's war effort. The cabinet enjoys much power within the government's hierarchy, being 
responsible for: sanctioning weapons programs (such as the TIE Defender project), supervising the armed forces, forming strategies and organizing expansionary or pacification campaigns. Despite this, Imperial High Command was unable to take any serious action against rebel sympathizers with allies in the Imperial Senate. The group worked closely with the Council of Moffs and notified the Imperial Ruling Council on important developments. Imperial High Command's demanding overseer is Darth Vader - also a Sith Lord - who relentlessly hounds the fledging Rebel Alliance, in addition to quelling insurgencies and purging the last of the Jedi Order. As Emperor Palpatine's handpicked second-in-command, Lord Vader is treated with almost the same deference as his master and has his personal battalion and armada- the 501st Legion and "Death Squadron" respectively - at his beck and call. Imperial High Command maintained a number of subdivisions, each charged with directing the naval, ground and intelligence assets of the Imperial Military. The most important of these were the Joint Chiefs, an executive group of senior officers who advised both the Emperor and the Commander-in-Chief on all martial-related matters. Other members included the Grand Admirals, a cadre of the twelve highest-ranking naval officers that helmed large Imperial fleets and policed Imperial Space; Grand Admiral Thrawn, the commander of the 7th Fleet, was the most famous of their number.

Council of Moffs
Aside from the Imperial Ruling Council and Imperial High Command, power resides in the hands of "administrators" (planetary governors) that form the Council of Moffs. The cabinet is composed of twenty Moffs (sector governors) and their superiors, the "Grand Moffs" (oversector governors), all of whom answer directly to the Emperor. The Moffs are senior officials who held the governorship over Administrators of minor provinces and commanded a Sector Fleet-size imperial armed forces at the sector level. The Grand Moffs are among the Galactic Empire's top figures, being on equal-footing with the Grand Vizier and the Commander-in-Chief and having been similarly appointed by the Emperor himself. The Council of Moffs works closely with Imperial High Command and is therefore able to dispose of the Imperial Military's assets to enforce the Emperor's authority in its "provinces". Governor Wilhuff Tarkin is the most prominent Grand Moff, having suggested the creation of the role.  and thus holds the distinction of being the very first.

Judiciary
In the series Andor, the Galactic Empire is depicted as arbitrary and cruel in its rule over ordinary people, particularly when it comes to certain agencies such as the Imperial Security Bureau (ISB), which acts as a secret police force. In the latter part of the series, the autocracy takes to retroactively extending the sentences of prisoners, moving prisoners around to different facilities after they are due to be released, euthanizing labor camp prisoners when they become too ill to work, not permitting defendants in criminal cases to present a defense, and committing mass murder when its officers feel they are losing control of a situation. It also engages in torture of subjects of interest and carries out arbitrary executions for political purposes. ISB agents are assigned to spy on political dissidents in the Imperial Senate, such as Senator Mon Mothma.

Imperial Security Bureau
The Imperial Security Bureau (ISB) is the civilian intelligence branch of the Galactic Empire that is charged with matters of internal state security and law enforcement, being analogous to the Gestapo or the Schutzstaffel, as well as the KGB. Consisting of several supervisors overseeing multiple sectors, they are charged with matters of counter-terrorism, criminal investigation, internal affairs, state security, state-sponsored propaganda and ensuring the political loyalty of citizens to the Galactic Empire. Veteran Colonel Wullf Yularen acts as ISB's main figurehead and spokesman, answering to the likes of Emperor Palpatine and Lords Vader and Amedda. 

Towards the end of the Galactic Empire's reign after the death of Emperor Palpatine, ISB officers were entrusted with carrying out Operation Cinder. When that operation fails and the empire collapses, some former ISB officers, such as Moff Gideon, become warlords and part of the Imperial remnants.

Sith Order

Outside the formal chain of command, the Galactic Empire's reins are held by the Sith, a cult Force-wielders - called Sith Lords - that call on the Dark Side in their plot to dominate the galaxy and destroy the Jedi. Both Emperor Palpatine and Lord Vader are part of this cult, although this is known to or guessed by only a very few figures in the regime's upper echelons, such as Governor Tarkin. The Imperial Inquisition, or Inquisitorius, acts as an extension of the Sith Order and its Force-attuned operatives, the Inquisitors, are routinely given control of Imperial Military assets to hunt down the Jedi Knights that survived the initial purge. The Inquisitors' lack of proper rank within the armed forces, as well as their reliance on "occult" ways, earn the ire of the standard officers. The Inquisitorius was founded by the Emperor and is governed by the Commander-in-Chief, but the agency is virtually led by a Grand Inquisitor who defers to both.

Military

Notable officers
Darth Vader - Dark Lord of the Sith, thus Palpatine's second-in-command, until his death in the Battle of Endor.
Mas Amedda – Grand Vizier of the Imperial Ruling Council and Vice-Chair of the Imperial Senate, later installed by Gallius Rax as puppet leader following Palpatine's death in Aftermath: Life Debt.  Amedda formally surrenders the Galactic Empire to the New Republic in Aftermath: Empire's End.
Wilhuff Tarkin – Grand Moff of the Oversector Outer and commander of the Death Star, until his death in the Battle of Yavin.
Thrawn – Grand Admiral of the 7th Fleet of the Imperial Navy, until being MIA upon his defeat in the liberation of Lothal.
Orson Krennic – Head of Imperial Weapons Division and director of the Death Star, until his death in the Battle of Scarif. Krennic was also the Head of Advanced Weapons research.

Tarkin Doctrine
In Star Wars, the Tarkin Doctrine was the plan presented by Tarkin himself to Palpatine in 18 BBY that outlined the Empire's goal and structure: bringing order to the galaxy and restoring rule of law to sectors overtaken by piracy and organized crime, ending destructive conflicts through grand strategy and military doctrine, a plan for maximizing social control and propaganda, maintaining economic order and increasing security in the Galactic Empire. Tarkin believed the chief factor that contributed most to the demise of the Republic was not, in fact, the war, but rampant self-interest, which left the body politic feckless and corrupt.

The plan which Palpatine ultimately had implemented in its entirety contained three main principles: territorial consolidation, rapid communication, and coercive diplomacy. Tarkin's concept was that rule could be established and maintained "through fear of force rather than force itself", and he believed grand displays of power—when combined with oppressive means of terrorizing communities—could suppress dissent and crush any would-be rebellion. This Doctrine became the Empire's core military doctrine of peacekeeping, internal security, counter-insurgency, and state terrorism-philosophy. The instrument of this power is the military, which includes the Imperial stormtroopers, a massive fleet of 25,000 Star Destroyers, 50 Super Star Destroyers, and the Death Star, a moon-sized superweapon capable of destroying entire planets.

Plans for the Death Star first appear (in universe chronology) in Attack of the Clones and construction begins at the end of Revenge of the Sith. Summarized measures set forth by the Tarkin Doctrine:
Establish "Oversectors" which contain tumultuous systems; to monitor and react to rebellious activities within those systems. Oversectors would be formed without regard for the borders of standard sectors and would receive more forces than other regions of the Empire. This Imperial presence would be designed to stop small rebel factions before they could become a larger established threat. An average of three Sector Groups would be deployed in an Oversector.
Assign command of each Oversector to a single individual who reports directly to the Emperor, in order to eliminate any delays created by political opportunism by Imperial advisors.
Improve communication resources and Imperial response time by placing modified HoloNet transceivers (cannibalized from existing HoloNet transceivers) aboard each flagship of every Sector Group within an Oversector command. Place similar facilities aboard the Emperor's flagship and in Imperial City on Imperial Centre (formally Coruscant).
Control unruly portions of the Galaxy through a fear of force rather than force itself. Through the combination of superior coordination of multiple Oversector groups and the control of information (news media) an impression of overwhelming force will be installed within the citizenry, thereby instilling the idea that resistance is futile.
Continue to research and develop new and more powerful starships and weapons designed to inspire fear in the resistant systems. Present the citizen with a weapon so powerful, so immense as to defy all conceivable attack against it, a weapon invulnerable and invincible in battle, that shall become a symbol for the Empire. This weapon must possess a power great enough to dispatch an entire system. Only a handful or one of these weapons would be required to accomplish this task.

Imperial Navy

The Imperial Naval Command (INC), also referred to as the Imperial Starfleet, is the foremost military arm of the Galactic Empire in charge of maintaining security, peace and order in the galaxy. Led by Darth Vader, it absorbed the military forces of the Galactic Republic after Emperor Palpatine's declaration of the New Order. 

At its peak, the Imperial Navy fields millions of warships, including an estimated 25,000 Star Destroyers, fulfilling the Emperor's will throughout the galaxy. The Empire's central warship cadre is well structured and uniformed, but the Imperial Navy suffers against strike craft, largely due to the inadequacies of its own starfighters and point defense. The Empire's focus on size, firepower, and terror comes at the expense of a well-balanced fleet. After its defeat at the Battle of Endor, the Galactic Empire splits up into warring factions, and the Imperial Starfleet along with it. While much of the remnants of the Imperial Navy are later reunited under impressive Imperial commanders, the military organization ceases to exist shortly after the death of the Emperor.

Specific responsibilities of the Imperial Navy include defending Imperial citizens from space-based threats (such as pirates, smugglers and rebel contingents), enforcing Imperial will, and overseeing commerce through customs and blockade operations. The Imperial Navy also performs orbital bombardments and transports major ground force deployments, supporting them with space, orbital, and aerial support. Imperial Navy officers wear the same standard uniform that their Army counterparts use but is colored grey, and both services use colored chest plaques to denote rank.

Imperial Starfighter Corps

The Imperial Starfighter Corps (ISC) was the starfighter pilot branch of the Galactic Empire. Although the Corps was a component of the Navy, most pilots were assigned to ground operations with the Imperial Army. Some Imperial starfighters include TIE (Twin Ion Engine) fighters, TIE Interceptors, TIE Defenders, TIE Strikers, TIE Silencers (by the First Order), and TIE Bombers. The Corps were scattered after the Battle of Endor (4 ABY).

Imperial Army
The Imperial Army was the ground based force.

Imperial Stormtrooper Corps

Imperial Stormtrooper Corps (ISC) are elite corps of rapid response all-environment shock troops—organized like the U.S. Marine Corps with their own separate divisions. The Stormtroopers operate in conjunction with the Army Ground Troopers and Navy Marine Troopers—who were used as garrison forces—to reinforce and hold defensive positions until the regular military arrived. When not in their signature white armor, stormtrooper officers wear black uniforms.

Galactic Civil War
After the formation of the Empire and the purge of the Jedi, Palpatine declares martial law throughout the galaxy. Those in hiding, or attempting to either flee from or oppose the New Imperial Order, are subject to persecution or death. This is the start of the bloody decades-long Galactic Civil War fought between the Empire and the Rebel Alliance.

As portrayed in the animated series Star Wars Rebels and The Bad Batch, the Empire explores ways to weaponize Force-sensitive kyber crystals, which are sacred to the Jedi and are at the core of every lightsaber. They mine for kyber crystals across worlds, but are thwarted twice in securing massive crystals by the Ghost crew and Saw Gerrera. On Jedha, however, the Empire uncovers a surplus of kyber, with which they power the Death Star.

The Death Star, a moon-sized battle station with sufficient firepower to destroy an entire planet, is designed to be the supreme weapon of the Empire's power. Tarkin, the station's commander, demonstrates that power in A New Hope when he destroys Alderaan as a show of force. In the film's climactic scene, however, the station is attacked by Rebel starfighters who have come into possession of the station's blueprints. The battle ends with the Death Star's destruction at the hands of Luke Skywalker, which is the Rebel Alliance's first major success against the Empire.

After the Battle of Yavin, Vader's special powers as Commander-in-Chief are increased by Palpatine, granting him full command over all other officials and officers to ease his campaign against the Rebellion. In The Empire Strikes Back, Vader becomes obsessed with finding the Force-sensitive Luke and leads his stormtroopers to attack on the Rebel base on Hoth, but the Rebels escape. Vader would continue to systematically and ruthlessly dismantle Alliance assets, and to hunt for Luke in the process, forcing Alliance survivors to abandon all static bases and regroup with Alliance HQ and remain nomadic.

In Return of the Jedi, after four years of conflict and near constant harassments by Vader's forces, the Alliance achieves a decisive victory over the Empire during the Battle of Endor. In the film's climactic battle, the Rebellion destroys the second Death Star and a number of capital ships that contain a great portion of the Imperial Navy's highest-ranking officers. During this battle, Vader redeems himself by sacrificing his life to kill Palpatine in order to save his son, Luke Skywalker.

The dual loss of the Emperor and his right-hand, the Commander-in-Chief, creates a power vacuum of chaos and instability. By design, the Empire had no clear line of succession; and there was no next-in-line after Palpatine and Vader. Revolts, infighting, fiefdoms and warlordism gradually fracture the Empire apart more effectively than any damage capable of being inflicted by the Rebel Alliance, as the Moffs and Grand Moffs maneuver to grab power for themselves amidst civil unrest.

Palpatine left posthumous orders. Upon verification of his death, messenger droids are sent to select Imperial officers to relay his last orders: to begin Operation: Cinder, a scorched earth policy tasking hardline Imperials to destroy entire planets so the Rebellion cannot claim them. The fallen Emperor does not desire the Empire to continue without his presence; if he cannot live forever as the galaxy's Emperor, he would rather see it destroyed.

A year after the Battle of Endor, the bolstered Rebellion defeats the weakened Empire during the Battle of Jakku and formally establishes the New Republic.

New Republic Era

By the time of The Mandalorian, set five years after the Battle of Endor, the Galactic Empire no longer exists as an official government or a major power and is essentially a failed state. Its former leaders who are now warlords that represent several different rump states, are competing with each other, as well as the New Republic over the power vacuum left behind. One Imperial remnant established a base on the planet Navarro, where Mandalorian bounty hunter Din Djarin was hired to acquire an asset, later revealed to be a Force-sensitive infant named Grogu. Djarin abandoned his job and decided to protect the child, making him an enemy of the Imperial warlord Moff Gideon and his army of mercenary stormtroopers.

Djarin later returned to Navarro, reuniting with his allies Greef Karga and Cara Dune, as well as an unnamed Mythrol, to take down an Imperial facility to eradicate the Empire's presence on the planet. The group soon discovered that it was housing Imperial experiments, using blood rich in midichlorians obtained from Grogu. The group succeeded in taking down the base. Gideon was informed of the developments while overseeing a unit of enhanced droids known as darktroopers, who would later help him capture Grogu. Djarin led a mission to rescue Grogu, assisted by several allies including Dune, Boba Fett, Fennec Shand, and Mandalorian warrior Bo-Katan Kryze. The group boarded Gideon's command ship and subdued him. Djarin turned Grogu over to Luke Skywalker, who took down the Moff's darktroopers.

Successor

The most successful remnants of the Empire reform as the First Order, led by Supreme Leader Snoke and former Imperial officers. They become a major faction in the galaxy in The Force Awakens and face a reformed Rebel Alliance called the Resistance. The First Order rises to power through the use of Starkiller Base, a converted planet turned into a superweapon that later destroys the Hosnian system, the location of the New Republic's capital. Starkiller Base is destroyed by the Resistance in The Force Awakens. In the sequel The Last Jedi, however, First Order forces draw the Resistance out of hiding and wipe out a majority of their fleet. During the battle, Snoke is killed by his apprentice Kylo Ren, who assumes the title of Supreme Leader.

In The Rise of Skywalker, the final film in the sequel trilogy, the First Order allies itself with the "Final Order", led by a faction of Sith cultists known as the Sith Eternal, overseen by none other than Palpatine, who had transferred his essence into a cloned body and formerly positioned himself to control the First Order over Snoke, a puppet ruler. The cult is stationed on the isolated Sith planet of Exegol. Palpatine offers Ren, who had tracked him to the planet, control of the Final Order in exchange for killing the young Jedi Rey, Palpatine's own granddaughter. Ren initially accepts the assignment, but later forsakes the dark side after a duel with Rey in the wreckage of the second Death Star. With Ren's defection, Palpatine turns command over to Allegiant General Enric Pryde, previously an Imperial officer.

With help from the spirit of Luke Skywalker, Rey eventually makes her way to Exegol, guiding the Resistance fleet away to the planet to take down the Final Order. With help from a redeemed Ren and the spirits of Jedi past, she resists Palpatine's promises of power and turns his own Sith lightning against him, destroying the Sith Lord once and for all. The Resistance fleet, with help from their allies across the galaxy, defeats the Sith Eternal fleet to officially wipe out the Final Order and the Galactic Empire with it, after a grand total of 54 years of its existence. It's unknown what succeeded it as the dominating government in the galaxy.

Legends

With the 2012 acquisition of Lucasfilm by The Walt Disney Company, most of the licensed Star Wars novels and comics produced since the original 1977 film, known as the Expanded Universe, were rebranded as Star Wars Legends and declared non-canon to the franchise on April 25, 2014.

Thrawn trilogy
In Timothy Zahn's "Thrawn trilogy" of novels – Heir to the Empire (1991), Dark Force Rising (1992), and The Last Command (1993) – an army of former Imperials, led by Grand Admiral Thrawn, attempt to overthrow the New Republic and install a dictatorship known as the Empire of the Hand. The backstory of the series explains that, following their defeat at the Battle of Endor, the Imperial sectors are governed by several different military juntas that fight each other in a conflict known as the Imperial Civil War, all the while resuming the Galactic Civil War with the Rebellion's successor, the New Republic, for control of the galaxy for years until mostly joining together under Grand Admiral Thrawn. By the time of The Last Command, Thrawn has nearly defeated the New Republic, but they claim victory in a last-ditch effort, and Thrawn is killed by his own bodyguard, shattering the Empire's unity.

Agent of the Empire

Agent of the Empire is a 10-issue comic book series published by Dark Horse Comics from 2011 to 2013. It was written by John Ostrander and illustrated by Stephane Roux, and is set three years before the original Star Wars film. Two five-issue story arcs follow an Imperial secret agent, and feature characters such as Han Solo, Princess Leia and Boba Fett. Both arcs were collected in trade paperback volumes.

Jedi Prince
In the Jedi Prince novel series, a group of impostors calling themselves the Prophets of the Dark Side install a three-eyed mutant named Trioculus as Emperor by claiming that he is Palpatine's son, reforming the Empire (as Trioculus's Empire). By the end of the series, Palpatine's true son, Triclops, helps the Rebels defeat this new enemy.

Dark Empire
In the Dark Empire comic book series, Palpatine is reborn in a clone body and unites most of the scattered remnants of the Empire (forming the Dark Empire), hoping to retake control of the galaxy. By the sequel, Empire's End, he is defeated and destroyed once and for all.

Jedi Academy trilogy
In the Jedi Academy trilogy, an Imperial admiral named Daala commandeers the remainder of the Imperial Navy (the Crimson Empire) and mounts a ferocious assault on the New Republic. She nearly succeeds in taking over the galaxy, but is foiled by New Republic pilots Wedge Antilles and Lando Calrissian in the final entry, Champions of the Force. A year later she would arrange the assassination of the rival Imperial warlords to unify the feuding Imperial factions into the Imperial Remnant and bring an end to the Imperial Civil War.

Darksaber
In the 1995 novel Darksaber, Daala, frustrated with the Imperial warlords in the Core fighting and bickering amongst themselves, orchestrates the warlords' deaths and unites and becomes the leader of the remaining Imperial forces. After being defeated in battle once again by the New Republic, she resigns and selects Gilad Pellaeon (originally in the Thrawn trilogy) as the new leader, where he becomes Grand Admiral Pellaeon. At the end of the novel, he signs a peace treaty with the New Republic representative Ponc Gavrisom and finally ends the Galactic Civil War.

New Jedi Order
By the time of the New Jedi Order series, the remaining Imperial military factions sign a truce with the New Republic, becoming the Imperial Remnant. The former enemies then become allies against the invading Yuuzhan Vong. A few years later, the Remnant help the Galactic Alliance fight an assimilating insect species known as the Killiks, which become a third party in the Second Galactic Civil War. Eventually, they make peace with the Alliance and Confederation. All three of these are represented by former Imperial commanders.

Legacy
The Star Wars: Legacy comic book series, set 127 years after the original Star Wars film, explains that, during a civil war, the New Galactic Empire known as the Fel Empire declares war on the Galactic Federation of Free Alliances (Galactic Alliance), the successor state of the New Republic, after 83 years of a cold war that began in 44 ABY. This conflict begins the Sith-Imperial War, which after three years leads to the eventual defeat of the Galactic Alliance and the Galactic Empire asserting its domination over the galaxy once again in 130 ABY. A few months later, the Sith overthrows the Fel Empire. The Sith Lord Darth Krayt, the leader of the One Sith, usurps the throne and forces Emperor Roan Fel to take refuge in the fortress planet of Bastion.

In 138 ABY, the Galactic Alliance Remnant led by Admiral Gar Stazi, Fel's forces known as the Empire-in-exile led by Empress Marasiah Fel, and the New Jedi Order led by Jedi Master K'Krukk unite against Krayt's empire and eventually destroy it in the Battle of Coruscant, after a grand total of 157 years of its existence. The three united factions form a new galactic government called the Galactic Federation Triumvirate. The One Sith, led by Darth Wredd, remains at large and wages a war against the GFT. One year later, the former Empire-in-exile works with the other two factions, killing Wredd and dissolving the One Sith. The next year, the GFT defeats the secular alliances of the One Sith and in the aftermath of that conflict, the galaxy enters an era of peace and unity.

See also
Isaac Asimov's Galactic Empire
Imperium of Mankind
List of Star Wars characters
Utopian and dystopian fiction
State terrorism

Notes

References

Further reading

Vision of the Future, 1st paperback printing 1999, Timothy Zahn, 
Star Wars Battlefront II: Inferno Squad, published 2017, Christie Golden

External links

DomusPublica.net (No longer active, this archive as of September 27, 2005 has at least some of the essays intact)
The Case for the Empire, The Weekly Standard
Web.Archive.org, "No Case for the Empire"
GalacticEmpireDatabank.com
Why did The Galactic Empire Hate Aliens?
Tarkin in the Star Wars Databank

Fan societies
The Empire Reborn - Roleplaying and gaming society (PC Games)
The Galactic Empire - Roleplaying game with strong emphasis on political and military training.
The Emperor's Hammer Strike Fleet - PC Gaming club for all Star Wars games and Star Conflict.

Villains in animated television series
Fictional elements introduced in 1977
Galactic empires
Star Wars governments
Film supervillains